Andrey Gerasimchuk (born February 7, 1987) is a Belarusian Muay Thai kickboxer who competes in the heavyweight division. He is a three time Kunlun Fight Tournament winner.

He was ranked as a top ten heavyweight by Combat Press from October 2015 until July 2018, when he was dropped from the rankings following an 18 month period of inactivity.

Kickboxing career

Kunlun Fight
Gerasimchuk fought in the 2014 Kunlun Fight Super Heavyweight tournament. He knocked out Arnold Oborotov in the semifinals, and defeated Dmitri Bezus by unanimous decision in the finals. He then fought in the 2014 Kunlun Fight Heavyweight tournament. He beat Abdarhmane Coulibaly by unanimous decision in the semifinals, and won the tournament with a third-round TKO of Wang Chongyang in the finals. He followed up this tournament win with decision wins over Sergio Pique and Rico Verhoeven.

Gerasimchuk participated in the 2015 Super Heavyweight tournament, after qualifying to it with a decision win against Ashwin Balrak at Kunlun Fight 18. He knocked out Steve Banks in the quarterfinal, but lost to Hesdy Gerges in the semifinal by split decision.

Gerasimchuk took part in the 2016 Kunlun Fight Super Heavyweight tournament, held at Kunlun Fight 52. In the quarterfinals, he beat Bruno Susano by unanimous decision and Atha Kasapis in the same manner in the semifinal. He faced Tsotne Rogava in the finals, and won the fight by decision, after an extra round was fought.

His last fight with Kunlun Fight came against Felipe Micheletti at Kunlun Fight 56. He won the fight by unanimous decision.

Glory
He made his organizational debut against Bruno Chaves at Glory 73: Shenzhen, after nearly three years away from the sport. The fight ended in a no contest after 69 seconds, as Gerasimchuk was unable to continue due to a low blow.

Championships and awards

Professional
World Kickboxing Network
 2011 WKN European Oriental Rules Super Light Heavyweight Championship
W5 Professional Kickboxing
 2011 W5 European 86 kg Championship
Kunlun Fight
 2014 Kunlun Fight 100 kg Tournament Winner
 2014 Kunlun Fight 95 kg Tournament Winner
 2016 Kunlun Fight 100 kg Tournament Winner

Amateur
5x Belarusian Championship K-1  86 kg (2009, 2010, 2011, 2012, 2013)

World Association of Kickboxing Organizations
 2008 WAKO World Cup (Hungary)  86 kg
 2009 WAKO World Cup (Hungary)  86 kg

International Federation of Muaythai Associations
 2009 IFMA European Championship (Latvia)  86 kg
 2009 IFMA World Championship (Thailand)  86 kg
 2010 IFMA European Championship (Italy)  86 kg
 2010 IFMA World Championship (Thailand)  86 kg
 2011 IFMA European Championship  86 kg
 2011 IFMA World Championship (Uzbekistan)  86 kg
 2012 IFMA European Championship (Turkey)  86 kg
 2012 IFMA World Championship (Russia)  86 kg
 2014 IFMA European Championship (Poland)  + 91 kg
 2015 IFMA World Championship (Thailand)  +91 (Best fighter of the World Championship Award)
 2016 IFMA World Championships (Sweden)  + 91 kg
 2017 IFMA World Championships (Belarus)  + 91 kg
 2018 IFMA European Championship (Czechia)  + 91 kg

Fight record

|-  bgcolor="#c5d2ea"
| 2019-12-07||NC||align=left| Bruno Chaves || Glory 73: Shenzhen || Shenzhen, China || No Contest (Accidental Foul) ||1 || 1:09 
|-
|-  bgcolor="#CCFFCC"
| 2017-01-02 || Win ||align=left| Felipe Micheletti || Kunlun Fight 56 || Sanya, Hainan, China || Decision (Unanimous) || 3 || 3:00
|-
|-  bgcolor="#CCFFCC"
| 2016-09-11 || Win ||align=left|  Tsotne Rogava|| Kunlun Fight 52 100+ kg 2016 Tournament Final ||  China ||Extra Round Decision || 4 || 3:00
|-
! style=background:white colspan=9 |
|-
|-  bgcolor="#CCFFCC"
| 2016-09-11 || Win ||align=left|  Atha Kasapis || Kunlun Fight 52  2016 Super Heavyweight Tournament Semi-Finals ||  China || Decision (Unanimous) || 3 || 3:00
|-  bgcolor="#CCFFCC"
| 2016-07-30 || Win ||align=left| Bruno Susano ||Kunlun Fight 48: Super Heavyweight Tournament, Final 8 || Jinan, China || Decision (unanimous) || 3 || 3:00
|-  bgcolor="#FFBBBB"
| 2015-06-07 || Loss ||align=left| Hesdy Gerges || Kunlun Fight 26 - Super Heavyweight Tournament, Semi Finals || Chongqing, China || Decision (split) || 3 || 3:00
|-  bgcolor="#CCFFCC"
| 2015-03-17 || Win ||align=left| Steve Banks || Kunlun Fight 21 - Super Heavyweight Tournament, Quarter Finals || Sanya, China || KO || || 
|-  bgcolor="#CCFFCC"
| 2015-02-01 || Win ||align=left| Ashwin Balrak || Kunlun Fight 18: The Return of the King - Super Heavyweight Tournament, Final 16 || Guangzhou, China || Decision (unanimous) || 3 || 3:00
|-  bgcolor="#CCFFCC"
| 2015-01-03 || Win ||align=left| Rico Verhoeven || Kunlun Fight 15 || Nanjing, China || Decision(unanimous)|| 3 || 3:00
|-
|-  bgcolor="#CCFFCC"
| 2014-12-05 || Win ||align=left| Sergio Pique || Kunlun Fight 14 || Bangkok, Thailand || Decision (Unanimous) || 3 || 3:00 
|-
|-  bgcolor="#CCFFCC"
| 2014-09-13 || Win ||align=left| Wang Chongyang || Kunlun Fight 10, Final || Minsk, Belarus ||TKO || 3||
|-
! style=background:white colspan=8 |
|-  bgcolor="#CCFFCC"
| 2014-09-13 || Win ||align=left| Abdarhmane Coulibaly || Kunlun Fight 10, Semi Finals ||  Minsk, Belarus || Decision (Unanimous) || 3 || 3:00
|-  bgcolor="#CCFFCC"
| 2014-06-29 || Win ||align=left| Dmitri Bezus || Kunlun Fight 6, Final || Chongqing, China ||Decision (Unanimous) || 3||3:00
|-
! style=background:white colspan=8 |
|-  bgcolor="#CCFFCC"
| 2014-06-29 || Win ||align=left| Arnold Oborotov || Kunlun Fight 6, Semi Finals ||  Chongqing, China || KO || 3 || 
|-  bgcolor="#FFBBBB"
| 2013-12-20 || Loss ||align=left| Nadir Gadzhiev  || Night of Muaythai 3 || Moscow, Russia || Decision (Split) || 3 || 3:00
|-  bgcolor="#FFBBBB"
| 2013-06-15 || Loss ||align=left| Nordine Mahiedinne  || Battle of Saint Raphael  || Saint-Raphaël, Var, France || Decision || 3 || 3:00
|-  bgcolor="#FFBBBB"
| 2013-04-20 || Loss ||align=left| Alexei Papin  || Battle at Moscow 11 || Moscow, Russia || Decision (majority) || 3 || 3:00
|-  bgcolor="#FFBBBB"
| 2012-12-16 || Loss ||align=left| Patrice Quarteron || Thai Fight 2012 Heavyweight Tournament, Semi Finals || Bangkok, Thailand || || ||
|-  bgcolor="#FFBBBB"
| 2012-11-08 || Loss ||align=left| Kurban Omarov || Open Balkan Gran Pri WAKO-Pro || Tiraspol, Moldova || Decision (majority) || 3 || 3:00
|-  bgcolor="#FFBBBB"
| 2012-05-01 || Loss ||align=left| Alexei Papin  || Papin vs Gerasimchuk  || Moscow, Russia || Decision (unanimous) || 5 || 3:00
|-  bgcolor="#CCFFCC"
| 2012-03-11 || Win ||align=left| Alexander Dmitrenko || Best Fighter - Russia vs. Belarus || Samara, Russia || KO (Right cross) || 1 || 
|-  bgcolor="#CCFFCC"
| 2012-02-04 || Win ||align=left| Rashid Abdurakhmanov || Corona Cup 18 || Moscow, Russia || RTD || 4 || 
|-  bgcolor="#CCFFCC"
| 2011-10-20 || Win ||align=left| Ivan Pentka || W5 || Krasnodar, Russia || KO || 1 || 2:45
|-
! style=background:white colspan=8 |

|-  bgcolor="#CCFFCC"
| 2011-09-10 || Win ||align=left| Annar Mammadov ||  || Minsk, Belarus || Decision || 3 || 3:00

|-  bgcolor="#CCFFCC"
| 2011-06-18 || Win ||align=left| Jean Philippe Ghigo || Grand Gala De Boxe Grasse  || Grasse, France ||Decision || 5 ||3:00
|-
! style=background:white colspan=8 |
|-  bgcolor="#CCFFCC"
| 2009-10-30 || Win ||align=left| Stanislav Popov || PFAMT Muaythai event || Omsk, Russia ||  KO (Right hook) || 2 || 
|-  bgcolor="#FFBBBB"
| 2007-02-21 || Loss ||align=left| Andrey Osatchiy  || Fight Club Arbat || Moscow, Russia || Decision (unanimous) || 3 || 3:00
|-  bgcolor="#FFBBBB"
| 2006-07-19 || Loss ||align=left| Denis Grachev  || Fight Club Arbat || Moscow, Russia || Decision (unanimous) || 3 || 3:00
|-
| colspan=9 | Legend:    

|-  style="background:#fbb;"
| 2018-07-04 || Loss|| align=left| Bugra Erdogan || 2018 IFMA European Championships, Semi Final || Prague, Czech Republic || Decision (30:27)|| 3 || 3:00 
|-
! style=background:white colspan=8 |

|-  style="background:#cfc;"
| 2018-07-01 || Win|| align=left| Alf Gibson || 2018 IFMA European Championships, Quarter Final || Prague, Czech Republic || WO||  ||  

|-  style="background:#fbb;"
| 2017-05-10|| Loss||align=left| Iraj Azizpour || IFMA World Championship 2017, Semi Final || Minsk, Belarus || KO  || 3 || 3:00 
|-
! style=background:white colspan=8 |

|-  style="background:#cfc;"
| 2017-05-07|| Win||align=left| Januwon Kyeon || IFMA World Championship 2017, Quarter Final || Minsk, Belarus || RSC.O || 1 ||  

|-  style="background:#cfc;"
| 2016-05-28|| Win|| align=left| Tsotne Rogava|| 2016 IFMA World Championships, Final || Jonkoping, Sweden || Decision || 3|| 3:00 
|-
! style=background:white colspan=8 |

|-  style="background:#cfc;"
| 2016-05-28|| Win|| align=left|  || 2016 IFMA World Championships, Semi Final || Jonkoping, Sweden || || ||  

|-  style="background:#cfc;"
| 2015-08- || Win|| align=left| Kirill Kornilov|| 2015 IFMA World Championships, Final || Bangkok, Thailand || Decision || 3|| 3:00 
|-
! style=background:white colspan=8 |

|-  style="background:#cfc;"
| 2015-08- || Win|| align=left| Nikolay Guessev || 2015 IFMA World Championships, Semi Final || Bangkok, Thailand || RSC.B|| 1 ||  

|-  style="background:#cfc;"
| 2014-09- || Win|| align=left| Tomasz Szczepkowski || 2014 IFMA European Championships, Final || Krakow, Poland || Decision || 3 || 3:00 
|-
! style=background:white colspan=8 |
|-  bgcolor="#fbb"
| 2012-09-11 || Loss ||align=left| Artem Vakhitov || 2012 IFMA World Championships, Semi Finals|| Saint Petersburg, Russia || Decision ||  || 
|-
! style=background:white colspan=8 |
|-  bgcolor="#cfc"
| 2012-09-09 || Win ||align=left| Gareth Rees || 2012 IFMA World Championships, Quarter Finals|| Saint Petersburg, Russia ||  ||  || 

|-  style="background:#fbb;"
| 2012-05-|| Loss ||align=left| Alexander Oleinik || 2012 IFMA European Championships, Semi Final || Antalya, Turkey || Decision || 4 || 2:00
|-
! style=background:white colspan=9 |

|-  style="background:#cfc;"
| 2011-04- || Win ||align=left| Artem Vakhitov || 2011 IFMA European Championships -86 kg/189 lb, Final || Antalya, Turkey || Decision || 4 || 2:00
|-
! style=background:white colspan=9 |

|-  style="background:#fbb;"
| 2010-12- || Loss||align=left| Alexander Oleinik || 2010 I.F.M.A. World Muaythai Championships, Finals || Bangkok, Thailand ||Decision ||4 ||2:00
|-
! style=background:white colspan=9 |

|-  style="background:#cfc;"
| 2010-12- || Win||align=left| Mickael Yapi|| 2010 I.F.M.A. World Muaythai Championships, Semi Finals || Bangkok, Thailand || ||||

|-  style="background:#fbb;"
| 2010-05-|| Loss ||align=left| Alexander Oleinik || 2010 IFMA European Championships, Final || Italy || Decision || 4 || 2:00
|-
! style=background:white colspan=9 |

|-  style="background:#cfc;"
| 2009-12-||Win||align=left| Javlon Nazarov || 2009 IFMA World Championships, Final || Bangkok, Thailand || Decision || 4 || 2:00
|-
! style=background:white colspan=9 |

|-  style="background:#cfc;"
| 2009-12-||Win||align=left| Alexander Oleinik|| 2009 IFMA World Championships, Semi Finals || Bangkok, Thailand || Decision || 4 || 2:00
|-
| colspan=9 | Legend:

See also
 List of male kickboxers

References

External links
 Fight Life profile

1987 births
Living people
Belarusian male kickboxers
Heavyweight kickboxers
Belarusian Muay Thai practitioners
Sportspeople from Minsk
Kunlun Fight kickboxers
Kunlun Fight kickboxing champions